The qualifying competition for UEFA Euro 2012 was a series of parallel association football competitions held over 2010 and 2011 to decide the qualifiers for UEFA Euro 2012, held in Poland and Ukraine. The draw for the qualifying rounds was held on 7 February 2010 in the Congress Hall of the Palace of Culture and Science, Warsaw, with matches set to take place between August 2010 and November 2011.

There were nine groups. Six of these groups had six teams (one each from pots 1 to 6 below); the remaining three groups consisted of five teams (one each from pots 1 to 5 below). Group competition was a double round robin: each team hosted a game with every other team in its group. The first-place team in each group qualified, along with the second-place team with the most points against teams ranked in the top five in the group. The remaining eight second-place teams were paired for two-game play-offs, with the winner of each total goals tie qualifying for the finals. The two host countries completed the field of sixteen teams.

Qualified teams

{| class="wikitable sortable"
|-
! Team
! Qualified as
! Qualified on
! data-sort-type="number"|Previous appearances in tournament
|-
|  ||  ||  || 1 (2008)
|-
|  ||  ||  || 0 (debut)
|-
|  || Group A winner ||  || 10 (1972, 1976, 1980, 1984, 1988, 1992, 1996, 2000, 2004, 2008)
|-
|  || Group C winner ||  || 7 (1968, 1980, 1988, 1996, 2000, 2004, 2008)
|-
|  || Group E winner ||  || 8 (1976, 1980, 1988, 1992, 1996, 2000, 2004, 2008)
|-
|  || Group I winner ||  || 8 (1964, 1980, 1984, 1988, 1996, 2000, 2004, 2008)
|-
|  || Group G winner ||  || 7 (1968, 1980, 1988, 1992, 1996, 2000, 2004)
|-
|  || Group B winner ||  || 9 (1960, 1964, 1968, 1972, 1988, 1992, 1996, 2004, 2008)
|-
|  || Group D winner ||  || 7 (1960, 1984, 1992, 1996, 2000, 2004, 2008)
|-
|  || Group F winner ||  || 3 (1980, 2004, 2008)
|-
|  || Group H winner ||  || 7 (1964, 1984, 1988, 1992, 1996, 2000, 2004)
|-
|  ||  ||  || 4 (1992, 2000, 2004, 2008)
|-
|  ||  ||  || 3 (1996, 2004, 2008)
|-
|  ||  ||  || 7 (1960, 1976, 1980, 1996, 2000, 2004, 2008)
|-
|  ||  ||  || 5 (1984, 1996, 2000, 2004, 2008)
|-
|  ||  ||  || 1 (1988)
|}

Seedings
The pot allocations for the qualifying group stage draw were based on the UEFA national team coefficient rankings as of the end of 2009. The sole exception was the automatic placement of Spain, as reigning European champions, as the top-ranked team (their coefficient ranking would have also placed them in this position anyway). Each nation's coefficient was generated by calculating:
40% of the average ranking points per game earned in the 2010 FIFA World Cup qualifying stage;
40% of the average ranking points per game earned in the UEFA Euro 2008 qualifying stage and final tournament;
20% of the average ranking points per game earned in the 2006 FIFA World Cup qualifying stage and final tournament.

The 51 entrants were divided into the following six pots for the drawing of nine qualifying groups on 7 February 2010 in Warsaw, Poland:

Teams in bold eventually qualified for the final tournament, teams in bold italic qualified for the final tournament through the play-offs, and teams in italic participated in the play-offs but did not qualify for the final tournament.

Notes
The co-hosts Ukraine and Poland, which qualified automatically, were ranked 19th (28,133) and 23rd (26,620) respectively.

Before the draw UEFA confirmed that, for political reasons, Armenia would not be drawn against Azerbaijan (due to the dispute concerning territory of Nagorno-Karabakh) and Georgia would not be drawn against Russia (due to the dispute regarding the territory of South Ossetia). 

Armenia and Azerbaijan were drawn together in Group A during the draw ceremony, forcing UEFA to reassign Armenia to Group B, as Azerbaijan had refused to play in Armenia when they had been drawn together during UEFA Euro 2008 qualifying.

Tiebreakers
If two or more teams were equal on points on completion of the group matches, the following criteria were applied to determine the rankings.
 higher number of points obtained in the group matches played among the teams in question;
 superior goal difference from the group matches played among the teams in question;
 higher number of goals scored in the group matches played among the teams in question;
 higher number of goals scored away from home in the group matches played among the teams in question;
 if, after applying criteria 1) to 4) to several teams, two or more teams still had an equal ranking, the criteria 1) to 4) was reapplied to determine the ranking of these teams. If this procedure did not lead to a decision, criteria 6) to 10) applied;
 superior goal difference in all group matches;
 higher number of goals scored in all group matches;
 higher number of goals scored away from home in all group matches;
 fair play ranking in all group matches;
 drawing of lots.

Summary

Groups
The following 18 dates were reserved for group matches in qualifying:
 3–4 and 7 September 2010
 8–9 and 12 October 2010
 25–26 and 29 March 2011
 3–4 and 7 June 2011
 2–3 and 6 September 2011
 7–8 and 11 October 2011
For the first time, Tuesday evenings replaced Wednesday evenings for midweek qualifying fixtures where two matchdays occurred in the same week. This was in order to allow players an extra day to return to their clubs for domestic duty the following week. Consequently, teams were permitted to move the earlier weekend match forward to the Friday evening.

Group A

Group B

Group C

Group D

Group E

Group F

Group G

Group H

Group I

Ranking of second-placed teams
The highest ranked second placed team from the groups qualified automatically for the tournament, while the remainder entered the play-offs. As five groups contain six teams and four with five, matches against the sixth-placed team in each group were not included in this ranking. As a result, a total of eight matches played by each team count toward the purpose of the second-placed ranking table.

Play-offs

The eight remaining second-placed teams contested two-legged play-offs to determine the last four qualifiers for the finals. The teams were seeded for the play-off draw according to the UEFA national team coefficient rankings updated after the completion of the qualifying group stage. The draw for the play-offs was held on 13 October 2011 in Kraków, Poland.

Seedings

Matches
The first legs were played on 11 November, and the second legs were played on 15 November 2011. The four play-off winners qualified for the final tournament.

Goalscorers

Notes

References

External links

 UEFA Euro 2012 at UEFA.com

 
Qualifying

2012
UEFA Euro 2012